Yelyzaveta Yurievna Zharka (born 14 June 1992) is a Ukrainian badminton player. She competed at the 2010 Summer Youth Olympics, 2015 and 2019 European Games.

Achievements

BWF International Challenge/Series (3 titles, 11 runners-up) 
Women's doubles

Mixed doubles

  BWF International Challenge tournament
  BWF International Series tournament
  BWF Future Series tournament

References

External links 
 

Living people
1992 births
Sportspeople from Kharkiv
Ukrainian female badminton players
Badminton players at the 2010 Summer Youth Olympics
Badminton players at the 2015 European Games
Badminton players at the 2019 European Games
European Games competitors for Ukraine
21st-century Ukrainian women